Hadropenaeus is a genus of prawns within the family Solenoceridae. Members of this genus are found at depths up to 1280 meters.

Species 

 Hadropenaeus affinis 
 Hadropenaeus lucasii 
 Hadropenaeus modestus 
 Hadropenaeus spinicaudatus

References 

Decapod genera
Solenoceridae